David Isaac Friley (born November 13, 1986), known professionally as Dave Free, is an American filmmaker, record executive, and former record producer. He is best known for his creative partnership with rapper Kendrick Lamar, with whom he founded the entertainment company PGLang. He has co-directed several music videos and films alongside Lamar under the collective name The Little Homies.

Early life 
David Friley was born on November 13, 1986, in Inglewood, California, the son of a couple from the North and South Sides of Chicago. He is the youngest of three children. Friley is a childhood friend of rapper Kendrick Lamar, having met while they were both in high school. After graduating, he worked as a computer technician while helping Lamar begin his rap career. He used his job to showcase Lamar's music to Anthony "Top Dawg" Tiffith, founder and CEO of independent record label Top Dawg Entertainment (TDE), which led to him signing a recording contract with the label in 2007.

Career 
Shortly after Lamar signed with TDE, Free joined the label as an in-house producer. He became a member of the hip hop production team Digi+Phonics alongside Sounwave, Willie B and Tae Beast and worked significantly on projects for the hip hop supergroup Black Hippy, composed of Lamar, Jay Rock, Schoolboy Q and Ab-Soul. Their production work received critical praise; Complex named Digi+Phonics as one of the top 25 new producers to watch out for in November 2012. BET named them as one of the top ten young producers on the rise in July 2013.

Free's business career began as the social media director for TDE. In 2007, he was named the label's co-president alongside Terrence "Punch" Henderson. Free subsequently became Lamar's manager during his tenure and co-directed several of his studio albums and accompanying music videos under the collective name The Little Homies. Their filmmaking work earned praise and led to the duo winning the Grammy Award for Best Music Video and the MTV Video Music Awards for Best Hip Hop Video and Video of the Year.

On October 4, 2019, Rolling Stone reported that Free had left TDE and was working independently. He was also helping rapper Baby Keem as he started gaining recognition and expressed his intention of "getting heavy into the film game." On March 5, 2020, Free and Lamar launched the "multi-lingual" entertainment company PGLang. Through the company, Free has written and directed several music videos and advertising campaigns for Calvin Klein, Converse and Cash App. On January 13, 2022, Free and Lamar announced they were producing an untitled comedy film with South Park creators Trey Parker and Matt Stone for Paramount Pictures.

References 

1986 births
21st-century African-American musicians
African-American film directors
African-American record producers
American music industry executives
American music managers
American music video directors
Filmmakers from California
Grammy Award winners
Living people
People from Inglewood, California
PGLang artists
Top Dawg Entertainment artists
West Coast hip hop musicians